is a Japanese sport shooter. Fukushima had won a total of nine medals (four golds, three silver, and two bronze) for both air and sport pistol at the ISSF World Cup series. She also captured two medals (silver and bronze) in the same events at the 1986 Asian Games in Seoul, South Korea.

Fukushima emerged as one of Japan's most prominent shooters in its Olympic history. She won the silver medal in the women's 25 metre pistol at the 1988 Summer Olympics in Seoul by four points behind winner Nino Salukvadze of the Soviet Union (now representing Georgia), with a total score of 686 targets (587 in the preliminary rounds and 99 in the final). Twelve years later, Fukushima achieved a fifth-place finish each in the air and sport pistol at the 2000 Summer Olympics in Beijing, accumulating scores of 483.7 and 684.8 points, respectively. She also competed at the 2004 Summer Olympics in Athens, but she neither reached the final round, nor claimed an Olympic medal.

Twenty years after competing in her first Olympics, Fukushima qualified for her fourth Japanese team, as a 44-year-old, at the 2008 Summer Olympics in Beijing, by placing second in the sport pistol from the ISSF World Cup series in Sydney, Australia, with a record-breaking score of 785.7 points. She placed thirty-eighth out of forty-four shooters in the women's 10 m air pistol by two points behind United States' Brenda Shinn from the final attempt, with a total score of 373 targets. Three days later, Fukushima competed for her second event, 25 m pistol, where she was able to shoot 288 targets in the precision stage, and 293 in the rapid fire, for a total score of 581 points, finishing only in tenth place.

Olympic results

References

External links

NBC 2008 Olympics profile

1963 births
Japanese female sport shooters
Living people
Olympic shooters of Japan
Shooters at the 1988 Summer Olympics
Shooters at the 2000 Summer Olympics
Shooters at the 2004 Summer Olympics
Shooters at the 2008 Summer Olympics
Olympic silver medalists for Japan
Sportspeople from Hokkaido
Olympic medalists in shooting
Asian Games medalists in shooting
Shooters at the 1986 Asian Games
Shooters at the 1998 Asian Games
Shooters at the 2002 Asian Games
Shooters at the 2006 Asian Games
Medalists at the 1988 Summer Olympics
Asian Games gold medalists for Japan
Asian Games silver medalists for Japan
Medalists at the 1986 Asian Games
Medalists at the 2002 Asian Games
Medalists at the 2006 Asian Games